Boroșești may refer to several places in Romania:

 Boroșești, a village in Scânteia Commune, Iași County
 Boroșești, a village in Sutești Commune, Vâlcea County